Alix André (née, Caseneuve; 17 April 1909 – 6 July 2000) was a French romance novelist. Between 1942 and 1980, she wrote dozens of books, some of which were translated into several other languages or reprinted episodically in women's magazines. She was a recipient of the Prix de l'Académie des jeux floraux and the Montyon Prize. André died in 2000.

Biography
Alix Caseneuve was born on 17 April 1909 in Lavelanet, Ariège. She married Antoine André, owner of the Château de Pech-Latt in Lagrasse, which produced a white wine typical of the Corbières appellation d'origine contrôlée. They had three children, Philippe, Serge and Jacques. 

André began writing novels in 1942 for Éditions Tallandier. Her first work, Notre-Dame des neiges, received the Prix de l'Académie des jeux floraux. Through 1980, she wrote around fifty popular romance novels in French, which were translated into several other languages and reprinted episodically in various women's magazines. She won the Montyon Prize in 1951 for Lac aux ours. 

Alix André died on 6 July 2000 in Carcassonne.

Awards
 Prix de l'Académie des jeux floraux
 Montyon Prize, 1951

Selected works

 Notre-Dame des Neiges, 1942
 Son altesse mon mari, 1944
 Le Prince blanc, 1946
 Escale dans la tempête, 1947
 La Route sans étoiles, 1947
 Le Chevalier errant, 1947
 L'Hymne au soleil, 1947
 Celle qu'on n'attend pas, 1948
 Le Seigneur de Grunfeld, 1948
 L'Éternel Passant, 1948
 La Maison du corsaire, 1950
 Lac aux ours, 1950
 Karen, étudiante, 1951
 L'Homme des solitudes, 1951
 Tamanova, 1952
 L'Ennemie, 1953
 Les loups hurlent, 1953
 Ordre du prince, 1954
 Un mariage sans importance, 1954
 Pour Tessa, 1955
 Tu seras ma vie, 1955
 La Dame de Malhanté, 1956
 La Tornade, 1956
 L'Héritage des Dunham, 1957
 On demande un amour, 1957
 D'or et de feu, 1958
 Le Maître de Mortcerf,1958
 L'Écuyer de la reine, 1959
 Dans l'ombre de Stéphane, 1960
 Tout l'amour du monde, 1962
 Ce soir-là à Venise, 1963
 La Folle Aventure, 1964
 Mon amour aux yeux clos, 1964
 Trois roses pour une infante, 1965
 Mon seigneur de Cornouailles, 1966
 Un homme venu de la nuit, 1966
 Ce mal (qu'on) [s']appelle l'amour, 1968
 La Nuit du Val-Sauvage, 1970
 Les Cent chevaux du roi, 1971
 Un jour, mon prince viendra..., 1972
 Un très brillant pirate, 1974
 L'Infidèle, 1976
 Les Neiges d'Offenburg, 1977
 Le "Concerto de l'Empereur", 1979

Notes

References

External links
 

1909 births
2000 deaths
20th-century French novelists
20th-century French women writers
French romantic fiction writers
People from Ariège (department)
People from Aude